The Georgetown Raiders are a Junior "A" ice hockey team from Georgetown, Ontario, Canada.  They are a part of the Ontario Junior A Hockey League.  The team began play in the Central Ontario Jr. B league and was known as the "Georgetown Gemini" until 1988.  The Raiders won the 2005 Dudley Hewitt Cup.

History
The Georgetown Gemini were founded in 1975 as members of the Central Junior B Hockey League.  They were the first junior club in Georgetown since the Jr. C Raiders folded in 1969.

The name "Georgetown Raiders" used to belong to a different team that competed in OHA Senior A and Intermediate A ranks in the 1970s and 1980s. The two clubs are not known to be connected.

At the 2006 OPJHL Showcase Tournament, the Raiders showed the host team Newmarket Hurricanes why they have been considered a top tier OPJHL team in recent years.  They started out the tournament with a close 5-3 win against the Seguin Bruins.  Their second game saw them manhandle the Atlantic Junior Hockey League's Tier III Junior "A" New York Bobcats by a score of 7-2.  They closed out the round robin with a 4-4 tie against the Atlantic league's New Jersey Rockets.  In the Quarter-finals, the Raiders found themselves deadlocked with the Eastern Junior Hockey League's Tier III Junior "A" Capital District Selects at the end of regulation.  They blew a 3-goal lead in the third period, but were saved at 6:46 of double overtime by Rob Sgarbossa.  Final score: 6-5 2OT.  The semi-final was much the same story.  Again against the New York Bobcats, the Raiders actually found themselves down by the midpoint of the third period.  They tied up the game with around 6 minutes to go and forced overtime.  With 6:01 left in triple overtime, Ryan Ford earned the Raiders a birth into the finals.  Final score: 5-4 3OT.  The final was a high scoring affair, ending with the Raiders defeating the host Newmarket Hurricanes by a score of 7-5.

Season-by-season record
Note: GP = Games Played, W = Wins, L = Losses, T = Ties, OTL = Overtime Losses, GF = Goals for, GA = Goals against

Dudley Hewitt Cup
Central Canada Championships
NOJHL - OJHL - SIJHL - Host
Round robin play with 2nd vs 3rd in semi-final to advance against 1st in the finals.

Royal Bank Cup
CANADIAN NATIONAL CHAMPIONSHIPS
Dudley Hewitt Champions - Central, Fred Page Champions - Eastern, Western Canada Cup Champions - Western & Runner Up, and Host
Round robin play with top 4 in semi-final and winners to finals.

Notable alumni
Art Webster
Scott Wilson
Krys Barch
Stanislav Chistov
Andrew Peters
Mike Wilson
Kevin J. Brown
Joey Tenute
Jeff Shevalier
Evan Rodrigues
Jack Hughes

External links
Raiders Webpage

Ontario Provincial Junior A Hockey League teams
Halton Hills
1966 establishments in Ontario
Ice hockey clubs established in 1966